National Intelligence Directorate may refer to:

 National Intelligence Directorate (Colombia), a Colombian intelligence agency
 National Intelligence Directorate (Pakistan), a Pakistani intelligence agency
 Dirección de Inteligencia Nacional, a defunct Chilean secret police agency